The 2003 Sarasota Clay Court Classic was a women's tennis event played on outdoor green clay courts in Sarasota, Florida in the United States that was part of the Tier IV category on the 2003 WTA Tour. It was the second and last edition of the tournament and was held from March 31 through April 6, 2003. Second-seeded Anastasia Myskina won the singles title.

Finals

Singles

 Anastasia Myskina defeated  Alicia Molik, 6–4, 6–1
 It was Myskina's 2nd singles title of the year and the 4th of her career.

Doubles

 Liezel Huber /   Martina Navratilova defeated  Shinobu Asagoe  /  Nana Miyagi, 7–6(10–8), 6–3

References

External links
 ITF tournament edition details

2003 WTA Tour
2003 in American tennis
2003 in sports in Florida
2005 Sarasota Clay Court Classic
Tennis tournaments in Florida